In enzymology, an aspartate-phenylpyruvate transaminase is an enzyme that catalyzes the chemical reaction

L-aspartate + phenylpyruvate  oxaloacetate + L-phenylalanine

Thus, the two substrates of this enzyme are L-aspartate and phenylpyruvate, whereas its two products are oxaloacetate and L-phenylalanine.

This enzyme belongs to the family of transferases, specifically the transaminases, which transfer nitrogenous groups.  The systematic name of this enzyme class is L-aspartate:phenylpyruvate aminotransferase. This enzyme is also called aspartate-phenylpyruvate aminotransferase.

References

 

EC 2.6.1
Enzymes of unknown structure